The IWRG Intercontinental Tag Team Championship (Campeonato Intercontinental de Parejas IWRG in Spanish) is a professional wrestling tag team championship promoted by the Mexican professional wrestling promotion International Wrestling Revolution Group (IWRG) since 2000. As it is a professional wrestling championship, the championship was not won not by actual competition, but by a scripted ending to a match determined by the bookers and match makers. On occasion the promotion declares a championship vacant, which means there is no champion at that point in time. This can either be due to a storyline, or real life issues such as a champion suffering an injury being unable to defend the championship, or leaving the company.

El Hijo de Canis Lupus and Rey Leon are the current champions, having defeated Los OGs (Joey Marx and Mason Conrad) on December 4, 2022 to win the titles. A total of 52 individuals have held the championship, 30 different teams for a combined 39 reigns. The tag team championship was created in 2000 when Yasushi Kanda and Susumu Mochizuki defeated Fantasy and Black Dragon to win the tournament. Bryce Benjamin and Marshe Rockett hold the record for the longest reign, 875 days, while the team of American Gigolo and MAZADA is the team to have held the title the shortest time, nine days. Los Megas (Mega and Ultra Mega) is the only team to have held the title three times while Dr. Cerebro has held it three times as well but with two different partners.

Title history

Combined reigns

By wrestler

Championship tournaments

2010 Tag Team Tournament
On January 14, 2010, IWRG announced that they had stripped then reigning IWRG Tag Team Champions, Ricky Cruzz and Scorpio, Jr., of the championship due to inactivity. At the same time, they announced an eight-team tag team tournament to crown new tag team champions. The tournament was announced as a "Father / Son" Tag team tournament with all teams being composed of fathers and sons. The first block took place on January 17, 2010 and featured four teams: El Canek and Hijo del Canek, Pantera and Hijo del Pantera, Olímpico and Exodia, and Negro Navarro and Trauma I. Block B took place on January 24, 2010, and featured the following teams: Brazo de Plata and Brazo de Plata, Jr., Fuerza Guerrera and Juventud Guerrera, Pirata Morgan and Hijo de Pirata Morgan, Máscara Año 2000 and Máscara Año 2000, Jr. Negro Navarro and Trauma I won "Block A" while Pirata Morgan and Hijo de Pirata Morgan won "Block B", which meant that the two teams met to determine the next Tag Team champions. On January 31, 2010 Pirata Morgan and Hijo de Pirata Morgan won the championship.

2015 Tag Team Tournament
In July 2015 IWRG announced that they were holding a tournament for the now vacant IWRG Intercontinental Tag Team Championship after IWRG stripped previous champions Chicano and Danny Casas of the championship.

2020 #1 contender tournament

Footnotes

References

External links
wrestling-titles.com
solie.org
cagematch.net

International Wrestling Revolution Group championships
Tag team wrestling championships
Intercontinental professional wrestling championships